Hyvin Kiyeng Jepkemoi (born 13 January 1992) is a Kenyan steeplechase runner. She won gold at the 2015 World Championships in Athletics and 2011 All-Africa Games, and bronze at the 2017 World Championships and 2012 African Championships in Athletics. At the Olympic Games, she won silver in Rio de Janeiro and bronze in Tokyo. , her personal best time of 9:00.01 ranks her 6th on the world all-time list.

Career
Early in her career, Jepkemoi competed in a variety of events; her main event was the 5000 metres, in which she placed fifth at the 2011 Kenyan Championships. At the 2011 All-Africa Games in Maputo she competed in both the 5000 metres and an event completely new to her, the 3000 metres steeplechase; she placed fourth in her main event but won an unexpected gold in the steeplechase, running 10:00.50 and outkicking Ethiopia's Hiwot Ayalew to win Kenya's first athletics gold medal at the Games.

In 2012 Jepkemoi started concentrating on the steeplechase and her times improved; her best time that year was 9:23.53, which she ran at the Gugl Games in Linz. She scored her first IAAF Diamond Race points with a third place at Weltklasse Zürich after Sofia Assefa, the original winner, was disqualified for a lane violation. At the Kenyan Championships Jepkemoi placed second and gained selection for the African Championships in Porto Novo, where she won bronze despite falling at the water jump. At the Kenyan Olympic Trials, however, she only placed fifth and failed to qualify for the Olympic team. Track & Field News ranked Jepkemoi ninth in the world for 2012, her first top ten ranking.

In 2013 Jepkemoi only placed fourth at the Kenyan Championships but third at the World Championships Trials, qualifying for the Kenyan team to the 2013 World Championships in Athletics in Moscow. At the World Championships, she placed sixth with a new personal best time of 9:22.05; she ended the year ranked seventh in the world, up two places from the previous year. In 2014 Jepkemoi's best race was at the Ostrava Golden Spike meeting, where she ran 9:22.58 and narrowly won ahead of Morocco's Salima Alami.

Jepkemoi opened 2015 with a near-personal-best of 9:22.11 at the Doha Diamond League meeting, placing third behind Virginia Nyambura and Ayalew. In her next Diamond League meeting, the Golden Gala in Rome, she improved her personal best by almost seven seconds and won in a meeting record 9:15.08, defeating both Nyambura and Ayalew. Three days later she was runner-up to Nyambura at the British Grand Prix in Birmingham, her third consecutive Diamond Race points finish.

At the 2016 Summer Olympics, she secured the silver medal with a time of 9:07.12, where only Ruth Jebet ran faster than her. She won the bronze medal five years later in Tokyo finishing behind Peruth Chemutai and Courtney Frerichs.

International competitions

References

External links

1992 births
Living people
Kenyan female steeplechase runners
World Athletics Championships athletes for Kenya
World Athletics Championships medalists
Kalenjin people
Athletes (track and field) at the 2016 Summer Olympics
Olympic athletes of Kenya
Olympic silver medalists for Kenya
Olympic bronze medalists for Kenya
Medalists at the 2016 Summer Olympics
Medalists at the 2020 Summer Olympics
Olympic silver medalists in athletics (track and field)
Olympic bronze medalists in athletics (track and field)
African Games gold medalists for Kenya
African Games medalists in athletics (track and field)
Kenyan female cross country runners
Athletes (track and field) at the 2011 All-Africa Games
World Athletics Championships winners
Athletes (track and field) at the 2020 Summer Olympics